Cajun Pawn Stars is an American reality television series on the History channel that debuted January 8, 2012, at 10 pm ET.

The show was the second spin-off of Pawn Stars, but unlike fellow spin-offs American Restoration and Counting Cars, it is entirely unrelated to the venue and staff of Pawn Stars.

Following its fourth and final season in 2012, the show went on hiatus, before effectively being canceled as the contract option date passed without renewal.

Synopsis
Cajun Pawn Stars revolves around another family-owned pawn shop, the Silver Dollar Pawn & Jewelry Center in Alexandria, Louisiana, which is owned by Jimmie "Big Daddy" DeRamus, who runs the store along with his wife Peggy and daughter Tammie. The shop claims to have over 100,000 items within its 20,000 square foot showroom.

The show's format is similar to the original Pawn Stars, as it features an array of collectible, antique and unusual items that people sell or pawn, complemented with "pop-up" facts related to the item.  Also, as with the original series, the shop sometimes consults an expert to give an appraisal/opinion on the item being sold or pawned.  In addition, at the second commercial break, a trivia question is asked in relation to the shop or item, as with Pawn Stars.

Episodes

References

External links
 
 Silver Dollar Pawn & Jewelry Center

2010s American reality television series
2012 American television series debuts
2013 American television series endings
History (American TV channel) original programming
Television shows set in Louisiana
Antiques television series
Alexandria, Louisiana
American television spin-offs
Reality television spin-offs
Pawn shops
Pawn Stars